An Army Training Regiment (ATR) provides Basic Training for elements of the British Army.

History
The British Army also used to have Army Training Regiments at Bassingbourn (closed in 2012), Harrogate (renamed the Army Foundation College), and Lichfield (closed in 2008).

Locations
Army Training Regiment Grantham (ATR G) located at Prince William of Gloucester Barracks, Grantham provides training for Army Reserve recruits.
Army Training Centre Pirbright (ATC P), comprising 1 and 2 Army Training Regiments (1 and 2 ATR) and HQ Regiment, located at Alexander Barracks, Pirbright  provides training for the Army Air Corps, the Royal Artillery, the Royal Corps of Signals, the Royal Logistic Corps, the Royal Electrical and Mechanical Engineers, the Adjutant General's Corps, the Royal Army Medical Corps and the Intelligence Corps.
Army Training Regiment Winchester (ATR W) located at Sir John Moore Barracks, Winchester provides training for the Royal Armoured Corps, the Army Air Corps, the Royal Artillery, the Royal Engineers, the Royal Corps of Signals, the Royal Logistic Corps, the Royal Electrical and Mechanical Engineers, the Adjutant General's Corps, the Royal Army Medical Corps and the Intelligence Corps.

See also
Army Training Unit

References

Training regiments of the British Army
Military units and formations established in the 1990s